The Kent Police Department (KPD) is the municipal law enforcement agency of Kent, Washington, United States. The main police station is located in downtown Kent.

Staff
The Kent Police Department staffing consists of 150 sworn personnel and 57 civilian personnel, as well as active Volunteer and Explorer programs. KPD is a state accredited law enforcement agency.  Specialty assignments include: Civil Disturbance Unit, SWAT, Hostage Negotiator, K9, Persons/Property Detectives, Special Investigations Unit, Special Operations Unit (bikes and marine), Neighborhood Response Team, Traffic, Hiring Unit, Training Unit, and Field Training Officer.  The Kent Police Department is constantly looking to hire qualified officers and civilians to serve the Kent Community.  The mission of the Kent Police Department is to "Aggressively Fight Crime while Serving with Compassion".

The Kent Police Department averages about 90,000 dispatched calls and 17,000 case reports per year.

Vehicles

The Kent Police Department currently uses the following vehicle types: Chevy Tahoe, Ford Police Interceptor, and Dodge Charger. In 2018 the Kent City Council approved the use of traffic enforcement funds to be used for the purchase of new Ford Police Interceptors, which will replace the Tahoes and allow nearly half of the sworn officers to take their vehicles home.

Crime statistics

Police chiefs since 1986

Rod Frederiksen, 1986-1991 
 Ed Crawford, 1991-2006 
 Steve Strachan (sheriff), 2006-2011  
 Ken Thomas, 2011-2018 
 Rafael Padilla, since 2018

References

1889 establishments in Washington (state)
Crime in Washington (state)
Government of King County, Washington
Municipal police departments of Washington (state)